The 1957 Bulgarian Cup Final was the 17th final of the Bulgarian Cup (in this period the tournament was named Cup of the Soviet Army), and was contested between Levski Sofia and Spartak Pleven on 7 November 1957 at Vasil Levski National Stadium in Sofia. Levski won the final 2–1.

Match

Details

See also
1957 A Group

References

Bulgarian Cup finals
1957 in Bulgarian sport
November 1957 sports events in Europe
PFC Levski Sofia matches
Cup Final